Klaipėda Free Economic Zone or Klaipėda FEZ is the first free economic zone in the Baltics. It was established in 1996, officially launched in 2002.

Klaipėda FEZ consists of 412 ha of land dedicated to manufacturing plants, logistics, and business park development. Klaipėda FEZ is located in Klaipėda (Lithuania), at the heart of Europe, and offers easy access to markets in the EU, Scandinavia via an extensive rail, road, AIRPORT and sea network. Klaipeda FEZ plays a key role in the regional and national economy, creating value amounting to around 2% of Lithuania’s annual GDP. It has a strong track record for providing extra care and service to multinational clients such as Indorama Ventures, Albright and others.

History

The first steps for the establishment of the zone were undertaken in 1996. In 1997, a management company was selected after reviewing five proposals. The Klaipėda FEZ is managed by Klaipėda FEZ Management Company (Lithuanian: Klaipėdos LEZ Valdymo Bendrovė), a private limited liability company. The Baltic Fund, an investment fund, financed by the Rockefeller and Company, Lazard, and investors from Saudi Arabia, owned about 60% of the management company. The remaining shares are owned by city enterprises, municipalities and the government of the Lithuanian Republic. Since 2001 the Rockefeller Foundation sold its shares to Pierre J. Everaert Family Trust based in Demarest New Jersey, thereby becoming the largest private shareholder of the KFEZ.

[Pennenox, Philadelphia USA - story eliminated as irrelevant to the development of the |KFEZ]
Another set of obstacles was raised during Lithuania's negotiations for accession to the European Union. Klaipėda FEZ began its activities in December 2001. In 2003, Thailand-based Indorama announced an investment of 80M euros into a plastic production factory. To further attract investors to FEZ, Lithuanian-based companies were allowed to participate since 2004. A year later, the FEZ began plans for expansion and further development of its land, requesting assistance from structural funds of the European Union. By the end of 2007, FEZ attracted some 600M litas (174M euros) of investments. Total attracted investments since 2002 is 783M Eur.

Currently, more than 5000 employees work at FEZ investor and supporting companies.

Location
Klaipėda FEZ is located in the south-eastern part of the city of Klaipėda, near the main transport Klaipėda-Vilnius highway. The distance to the Port of Klaipėda is 8 km, while to Klaipeda-Palanga International Airport it is 35 km, to Kaunas Airport it is 218 km, and to Vilnius Airport it is 304 km.

Operations within FEZ
Klaipėda FEZ community currently connects over 5000 employees working in more than 100 industrial businesses focused in the Plastics & PET, food processing, offshore & large metal structures, electric vehicles & components, value added logistics and other industries.

Klaipėda FEZ has 45 clients which are foreign and Lithuanian companies. In total, 18 countries are represented. Total investments are approx. 726M Euros.

In total, the companies based in Klaipėda FEZ account for 2.7% of national exports in 2017 and nearly 60% of Klaipėda’s foreign direct investment is accumulated at the Klaipėda FEZ.

Klaipėda FEZ is a recognised economic project of national significance.

Companies

Major companies operating within Klaipėda FEZ: 
 Orion Global PET
 Neo Group
 Retal Baltic
 Glassbel Baltic 
 Espersen  
 Mestilla
 Be-Ge Baltic
 Pack Klaipėda
 Skuba Lietuva 
 Klaipėda Business Park
 Albright Lietuva
 Gren Klaipėda
 Dancer Bus
 Klaipėdos metalo konstrukcijų gamykla
 ANI Plast
 HeidelbergCement Group 
 Vingės logistika
 AD REM LEZ
 AD REM PORT
 Gera mėsa
 Lavango Engineering LT
 Lindström   
 Focus Fabrication Group
 Philip Morris International (operating outside the official Klaipėda FEZ territory)
 Baltijos Eukutecas

Achievements
 Main Award for Digitization and Red Tape Reduction, Honourable Mention for Industry 4.0 and Positive Impact at Economic Zone Sustainable Recovery Strategies Awards 2021
 Honourable Mention for EU Compliance, 5G connectivity at Global Free Economic Zone of the Year Awards 2021
 Bespoke Award for Sustainability at Global Free Economic Zone of the Year Awards 2020
 Honourable Mention for Investor Expansions, Local transport, Workforce Amenities, FlexStart at Global Free Economic Zone of the Year Awards 2019
 Bespoke Award for Investor Expansions, Investor Incentives, Economic Impact and Flexible Space at Global Free Economic Zone of the Year Awards 2018
 In 2017 Klaipeda FEZ was recognised within the categories of “Quick Launch award” (Editor’s choice), Expansion, Energy Efficiency, Specialism (for Plastics industry) and Contribution to the National economy. Investors wishing to establish operations in Lithuania’s Klaipeda FEZ can use the zone’s Fast Factory Launch scheme. The scheme offers companies ready for use sites that come complete with all the required construction permits, as well as the ability to make minor adjustments to customise the site to fit the investor’s needs. Outside of Klaipeda, construction permits in Lithuania can take up to six months. Additionally, the Flexstart programme aims to allow investors to commence operations in less than one month, with customisable pre-built manufacturing facilities. New offices are currently under construction that will be offered to SMEs as part of the programme.

General Facts & Information
 Address – Pramonės Str. 8, LT-94102, Klaipėda, Lithuania.  
 Official website: www.fez.lt 
 Klaipeda FEZ is managed and administered by the Klaipeda FEZ Management Company, CEO Eimantas Kiudulas.
 Start of operations: 2002
 Total area: 412 ha
 Number of operating companies: 100+, Klaipėda FEZ clients: 45+.
 No. of countries represented by companies: 18
 Jobs created: 5000+
 Total attracted investments: 783M Eur.
 State investment: 6,4M Eur. 
 Revenue generated by investors in 2021: about 1,22bn Eur.
 Export in 2021: 594M Eur.

References

External links 

 

Economy of Klaipėda
Free economic zones of Lithuania